Russell Kennedy (born 7 October 1991) is a Canadian cross-country skier. He competed in the 2018 Winter Olympics.

Kennedy is a graduate of Alberta's Athabasca University.

Cross-country skiing results
All results are sourced from the International Ski Federation (FIS).

Olympic Games

World Championships

World Cup

Season standings

References

External links

1991 births
Living people
Cross-country skiers at the 2018 Winter Olympics
Canadian male cross-country skiers
Olympic cross-country skiers of Canada
Paralympic sighted guides